Andrey Ivanovich Lavrov (born March 26, 1962 in Krasnodar) is a Russian (and former Soviet) handball goalkeeper and the only three times Olympic handball champion.

Lavrov is also one of only a few athletes to have won Olympic gold medals for three different teams, winning gold for the Soviet Union in 1988, the Unified Team in 1992, and for Russia in 2000. Four years later, at the age of 42, he won his fourth olympic medal, another unique feat for a handball player, when his Russian team earned third place and the bronze medals at the 2004 Athens Olympic games.

Lavrov was a long time captain for the Russian handball team, and he was Flag Bearer for the Russian athletes at the 2000 Summer Olympics Opening Ceremony of the Sydney Summer Olympics.

Lavrov has also won two World Championships for Russia, in 1993 and in 1997, as well as the European Championship in 1996.

In 2001, Andrey Lavrov was voted "Russian handball player of the century" in his home country.

See also 
 List of athletes with the most appearances at Olympic Games

References
 
  Biography

1962 births
Living people
Soviet male handball players
Russian male handball players
Handball players at the 1988 Summer Olympics
Handball players at the 1992 Summer Olympics
Handball players at the 1996 Summer Olympics
Handball players at the 2000 Summer Olympics
Handball players at the 2004 Summer Olympics
Olympic handball players of the Soviet Union
Olympic handball players of the Unified Team
Olympic handball players of Russia
Olympic gold medalists for the Soviet Union
Olympic gold medalists for the Unified Team
Olympic gold medalists for Russia
Olympic bronze medalists for Russia
Sportspeople from Krasnodar
RK Zagreb players
Olympic medalists in handball
Medalists at the 2004 Summer Olympics
Medalists at the 2000 Summer Olympics
Medalists at the 1992 Summer Olympics
Medalists at the 1988 Summer Olympics
Members of the Federation Council of Russia (after 2000)